Daniel Dyulgerov (born 19 September 1988 in Petrich) is a Bulgarian footballer. He currently plays as a forward for Septemvri Simitli.

Career
Born in Petrich Daniel Dyulgerov started to play football in local team Belasitsa.

2006
In 2006 the Youth Academy defender Daniel Dyulgerov agreed the conditions of his first professional contract with the club which was to be effective for four years.

2007
Dyulgerov has made his official debut for Belasitsa in Bulgarian first division in a match against Chernomorets Burgas on 12 August 2007 as a 61st minute substitute. The result of the match was a 1:6 loss for the team from Petrich. During season 2007/2008 Daniel played in 21 matches for Belasitsa.

In October 2007 the Bulgarian national under-21 coach Aleksandar Stankov called up Dyulgerov for Bulgaria national under-21 football team for a match with Portugal U21. The result of the match was a 1:0 win for Bulgaria, but Daniel didn't play.

References

External links
 Footmercato profile

1988 births
Living people
Bulgarian footballers
First Professional Football League (Bulgaria) players
PFC Belasitsa Petrich players
Association football defenders
FC Pomorie players
FC Septemvri Simitli players
People from Petrich
Sportspeople from Blagoevgrad Province